Jocelyn "Jackie" Lane (born 16 May 1937) is a former actress and model of the 1950s and 1960s. She was married to Prince Alfonso of Hohenlohe-Langenburg.

Early life
Lane was born as Jocelyn Olga Bolton in Vienna, Austria in 1937. She is the youngest daughter of Russian-born pianist mother Olga Mironova and English father Briton John Bolton, who worked for an American oil firm; he later died in a car crash in the US. She was educated in New Rochelle, New York, in the United States. At the age of 14, she moved to Britain, where she received dance training. Her older sister Mara Lane was a well-known British model and actress in the 1950s.

Career
Lane established herself as a popular model in the United Kingdom by the time she was 18, using the pseudonym Jackie Lane. She appeared in several British films beginning in 1955 with a travelogue April in Portugal. One of her most striking film roles in the 1950s was as the second female lead in These Dangerous Years (1957), directed by Herbert Wilcox and starring Frankie Vaughan. As Lane was confused with another actress named Jackie Lane (known for starring in Doctor Who), she began to be credited with her full first name when she moved to Hollywood in 1964. Her resemblance to Brigitte Bardot was widely remarked upon. She was featured in the September 1966 issue of Playboy magazine.

In 1965, she co-starred with Elvis Presley in Tickle Me and later appeared in several roles in Hollywood films, including as "biker chick" Cathy in Hell's Belles in 1969. She also made guest appearances on American television series. She retired in 1971 after marrying Prince Alfonso of Hohenlohe-Langenburg in Marbella, Spain on 3 May 1973.

Personal life
Lane gave birth to Princess Arriana Theresa Maria of Hohenlohe-Langenburg, her only child, in 1975. In 1985, her marriage to Prince Alfonso ended in a divorce, and she received a million-dollar settlement. She claimed that the sum was "not really fitting for a princess".

Lane designs feather necklaces marketed as Princess J Feather Collection in California and London.

Filmography

Film appearances

Television appearances

References

External links

Jocelyn at Elvis' Women
3B Theater A comprehensive review of the movie "Tickle Me"

1937 births
Living people
English female models
English people of Russian descent
English film actresses
Princesses of Hohenlohe-Langenburg
Actresses from New Rochelle, New York
21st-century American women